Hygrophoropsis panamensis is a species of fungus in the family Hygrophoropsidaceae. Found in Panama, it was described as new to science in 1983 by mycologist Rolf Singer.

References

External links

Hygrophoropsidaceae
Fungi described in 1983
Fungi of Central America
Taxa named by Rolf Singer